Phratora frosti is a species of leaf beetle in the family Chrysomelidae. This species is known from Nova Scotia to Alberta. It feeds on willow species and varies in color from blue to purple to coppery, with pale legs.

References

Chrysomelinae
Articles created by Qbugbot
Beetles described in 1951